Bogadjim is a village on Astrolabe Bay, just south of Madang, in Astrolabe Bay Rural LLG, Madang Province, Papua New Guinea. During World War II, the Japanese started to build a track from Bogadjim over the Finisterre Mountains into the Ramu Valley and the village became an important base.

The Anjam or Bogadjim language is spoken in the village.

References

Populated places in Madang Province